Sky Lovers may mean:

Sky Lovers (TV series), 2002 Chinese TV series
Sky Lovers (film), 2002 Chinese film, unrelated to the TV series